The 1958 William & Mary Indians football team represented William & Mary during the 1958 NCAA University Division football season.

Schedule

NFL Draft selections

References

William and Mary
William
William & Mary Tribe football seasons